Ampanefena is a town and commune in northern Madagascar. It belongs to the district of Vohemar, which is a part of Sava Region. 
In 2008 its population was estimated to 23.000.

Primary and junior level secondary education are available in town. The majority 98% of the population of the commune are farmers, while an additional 1% receives their livelihood from raising livestock. The most important crop is vanilla, while other important products are coffee and rice.  Industry and services provide both employment for 0.5% of the population.

Geography
The town is situated at the Route nationale 5a , halfway between Vohemar (72 km) and Sambava (74 km).

Known persons
 Paul Marius Fontaine, 1963, singer, (known as Fenoamby)

References 

Populated places in Sava Region